Abu Reza Fazlul Haque Bablu Bangladesh Nationalist Party politician. He was elected a member of parliament from Mymensingh-5 in February 1996.

Career 
Bablu is a lawyer and president of Muktagachha Upazila BNP. He was elected to parliament from Mymensingh-5 as a Bangladesh Nationalist Party candidate in 15 February 1996 Bangladeshi general election.

References 

Living people
Year of birth missing (living people)
People from Mymensingh District
Bangladesh Nationalist Party politicians
20th-century Bangladeshi lawyers
6th Jatiya Sangsad members